John Vaughan-Davies (born 22 December 1980) is a Zimbabwean cricketer. He played thirteen first-class matches between 1999 and 2002.

See also
 CFX Academy cricket team

References

External links
 

1980 births
Living people
Zimbabwean cricketers
CFX Academy cricketers
Midlands cricketers
Sportspeople from Harare